The Leningrad Regional Committee of the Communist Party of the Soviet Union, commonly referred to as the Leningrad CPSU obkom, was the position of highest authority in Leningrad Oblast during most of the existence of the Soviet Union. The position was created on 1 August 1927, and abolished on 29 August 1991 although most authority was lost in June that year to the position of Governor of Leningrad Oblast. The First Secretary was a de facto appointed position usually by the Politburo or the General Secretary himself.

First Secretaries
The following individuals served as first secretaries of the Leningrad Regional Committee of the Communist Party of the Soviet Union.

Second Secretary

See also
Leningrad City Committee of the Communist Party of the Soviet Union

Sources
 World Statesmen.org

Regional Committees of the Communist Party of the Soviet Union
Politics of Leningrad Oblast
1927 establishments in the Soviet Union
1991 disestablishments in the Soviet Union